Francisco Javier Oliete Valle (born 9 September 1970) is a Spanish retired footballer who played as a left back.

External links

Celta de Vigo biography 

1970 births
Living people
Footballers from Zaragoza
Spanish footballers
Association football defenders
La Liga players
Segunda División players
Segunda División B players
Tercera División players
FC Barcelona Atlètic players
FC Barcelona players
Albacete Balompié players
RC Celta de Vigo players
Villarreal CF players
Sporting de Gijón players
UE Lleida players
CD Teruel footballers
Spain youth international footballers
Spain under-23 international footballers